The 2017 Coca-Cola 600, the 58th running of the event, was a Monster Energy NASCAR Cup Series race held on May 28 and 29th, 2017 at Charlotte Motor Speedway in Concord, North Carolina. Contested over 400 laps on the 1.5 mile (2.42 km) asphalt speedway, it was the 12th race of the 2017 Monster Energy NASCAR Cup Series season. Austin Dillon won the first race of his NASCAR Cup Series career for Richard Childress Racing in car number 3, the first time the 3 car had won a Cup Series event since 2000. It was also the first race to be broken into four stages rather than the normal three.

Report

Background

The race was held at Charlotte Motor Speedway, which is located in Concord, North Carolina. The speedway complex includes a  quad-oval track that will be utilized for the race, as well as a dragstrip and a dirt track. The speedway was built in 1959 by Bruton Smith and is considered the home track for NASCAR with many race teams based in the Charlotte metropolitan area. The track is owned and operated by Speedway Motorsports Inc. (SMI) with Marcus G. Smith serving as track president.

Entry list

First practice

Qualifying

Harvick said afterwards that in qualifying, the cars were more loose "than they were in practice and just based on past experience here it was a handful through one and two. I just about lost it the first run, but the car was so good in three and four I didn’t want to over-adjust on it and make it too tight down there because you get tighter as the lap runs, so the guys did a good job of making adjustments, but not making it so tight that I couldn’t carry the throttle like I needed to in three and four. So they just did a great job on our Mobil 1 Ford.”

Qualifying results

Practice (post-qualifying)

Second practice

Final practice

Race

First stage
Kevin Harvick led the field to the green at 6:24 p.m. He got loose in Turn 3 the following lap and Kyle Busch passed him on his high side to take the lead. Exiting Turn 4 on lap 19, a piece of Jeffrey Earnhardt's car fell off and was hit by Chase Elliott's car, which burst into flames in the engine area near the start/finish line. Brad Keselowski was making a pass on Martin Truex Jr. when Elliott's car started slowing down in front of him. He attempted to veer away too late and slammed into the rear-end of Elliott, bringing out the first caution of the race and was also the competition caution despite it being scheduled for lap 25. Keselowski said afterwards that someone "broke," oil "was just...everywhere (though NASCAR stated later that there was no oil)" and that he "couldn’t turn. I ran into the back of Chase. Somebody broke in front of him and then he ran over what they broke and then he broke." Harvick exited pit road first. Jamie McMurray restarted from the tail-end of the rear for speeding.

The race settled into a green flag run after the lap 28 restart and was only interrupted by a cycle of green flag stops on lap 67, which Truex came out of as the race leader. He led unchallenged until lap 87, when Busch closed the gap to half a second. Two laps later, Busch faked him out and passed under him on the backstretch to retake the lead entering Turn 3 on lap 89. Busch went on to win the first stage at lap 100, and the second caution flew the same lap for the conclusion of the stage. As was the case with the previous caution, Harvick exited pit road first.

Second stage
Truex got the superior restart and took back the lead on lap 108. Harvick settled into second, but made an unscheduled stop for what turned out to be a loose left-rear wheel on lap 125. Rounding Turn 1 on lap 141, Matt DiBenedetto suffered a right-front tire cut and slammed the wall, bringing out the third caution. The red flag was displayed two laps later for lightning in the area, and the ensuing downpour, for over 90 minutes (1:39.56). When the red flag was lifted shortly after 9:30 p.m., the field paced a few laps under yellow to help the drying process.

The race resumed on lap 154. Jimmie Johnson reeled in Truex, but the clean air advantage Truex maintained as the race leader proved too much for Johnson to make the pass for the lead. The run lasted just 20 laps, as caution flew for the fourth time on lap 174 when Danica Patrick cut a right-side tire and got out of the racing groove, but didn't make contact with the wall. Ryan Blaney, who was running in the top-five, broke a rear axle exiting pit road, sending him to the garage for a few laps. Paul Menard stayed out to save a set of tires but got gobbled up on the restart by guys with fresh tires.

The final 21 laps of the second stage were uneventful for Truex, who drove on to win the second stage. The race went back under caution for the end of the stage at lap 200.

Third stage
When the race resumed on lap 205, it settled into a green flag run with Truex in control. It was disrupted on lap 245 when Ty Dillon blew an engine exiting Turn 4, bringing out the sixth caution. Harvick, running 10th, spun out in the oil trail left by Dillon. Kasey Kahne ran through the oil trail and slammed the wall in Turn 3. Kyle Larson also made contact with the wall in Turn 4, but made it to pit road to repair the damage. Johnson, who pitted under the prior caution, opted not to pit under this caution when Truex and the others did and assumed the race lead.

Truex got a superior restart to Johnson on the lap 252 restart. As with the previous run, this settled into a green flag run, halted when Larson suffered a right-front tire blowout and slammed the wall in Turn 1 on lap 292, bringing out the seventh caution. Larson said he was "really loose" entering (Turn) 3, "hit the wall" earlier in the stage, sustained "a lot of damage and the tire started to go down and then exploded in (Turn) 1. I just hate it that I made a mistake there in Turn 3 and got in the wall. I was not even running hard up there. I just got loose and then I hit it and it ruined our day.” Ricky Stenhouse Jr. elected not to pit and assumed the race lead who also alongside Menard tried to also save a set of tires.

The race resumed under a three-lap shootout to end the stage. Stenhouse spun his tires on the restart and clogged up the field as he fell through on the outside line. This allowed Denny Hamlin on the inside line to take the lead and win the stage. Caution flew for the eighth time on lap 300 for the conclusion of the stage.

Final stage

Busch took the lead on the restart with 94 laps to go. Truex caught him with 85 to go and remained hot on his tail. Caution flew for the ninth time with 72 to go when Patrick hit the wall in Turn 3.

Truex took the lead back from Busch on the ensuing restart with 67 to go and held it until the final cycle of green flag stops with 33 to go. Johnson was one of seven drivers who chose, rather than pit, to play the fuel strategy card. Truex and Busch on fresher tires made their way through the field and cut the deficit to 3.5 seconds back of the race leader. With two laps to go, Johnson's fuel tank ran dry. Austin Dillon assumed the race lead and preserved enough fuel and hold off Kyle Busch and Truex Jr. to score his maiden Monster Energy NASCAR Cup Series victory and take the 3 car back to victory lane since Dale Earnhardt in 2000 at Talladega.

Post-race

Driver comments
Dillon said in victory lane that, "truthfully," the notion that he won hadn't "sunk in," and that he was "proud of all the effort that" his team "put in. I really feel like I have the best team and the best pit crew. I have no doubt in them. My grandfather has done everything he can to give us the best we can get. Sometimes I feel like we’re the small team out there trying to get everything we can. Tonight proved that 600-mile race when it came down to it, we had everything we needed. It just feels amazing.” He added that he was simply "trying to be patient with (Johnson)," and that he "could see him saving (fuel)." He believed he "saved enough early where I could attack at the end, but I tried to wait as long as possible. And when (Johnson) ran out, I figured I’d go back into save mode where I was lifting, and it worked out. I ran out at the line and it gurgled all around just to do one little spin and push it back to victory lane.”

Busch, in his post-race media availability in the Charlotte Motor Speedway deadline room, was asked if Dillon's fuel strategy move surprised him, to which he replied "I'm not surprised about anything. Congratulations.” He then slammed the microphone down on the podium and left.

Truex, who led a race-high of 233 laps on his way to a third-place finish, said it "stings a little bit," but added he couldn't "say enough about the guys on the team and everybody in Denver. He said that all "on this Bass Pro Toyota did a heck of a job today. He said that his team "missed it a little bit on our last adjustment" and "if not for that we probably could’ve gotten the 3 (Dillon). And then lapped traffic is just so tough here. There’s a few guys out there that you don’t ever know where they’re going to be when you get to the corner and it cost you so much time trying to pass them, ultimately that’s what got us. It is what it is. Like I said, we’re proud of everybody at TRD, at Toyota, Bass Pro and all the partners. Just came up a little short tonight.”

Race results

Stage results

Stage 1
Laps: 100

Stage 2
Laps: 100

Stage 3
Laps: 100

Final stage results

Stage 4
Laps: 100

Race statistics
 Lead changes: 10 among different drivers
 Cautions/Laps: 9 for 53
 Red flags: 1 for 1 hour, 39 minutes and 56 seconds
 Time of race: 4 hours, 19 minutes and 22 seconds
 Average speed:

Media

Television
Fox Sports televised the race in the United States for the seventeenth consecutive year. Mike Joy was the lap-by-lap announcer, while three-time Coca-Cola 600 winner, Jeff Gordon and five-time race winner Darrell Waltrip were the color commentators. Jamie Little, Chris Neville, Vince Welch and Matt Yocum reported from pit lane during the race.

Radio
Radio coverage of the race was broadcast by the Performance Racing Network (PRN), and was simulcasted on Sirius XM NASCAR Radio. Doug Rice, Mark Garrow and Wendy Venturini called the race in the booth when the field raced through the quad-oval. Rob Albright reported the race from a billboard in turn 2 when the field was racing through turns 1 and 2 and halfway down the backstretch. Pat Patterson called the race from a billboard outside of turn 3 when the field raced through the other half of the backstretch and through turns 3 and 4. Brad Gillie, Brett McMillan, Jim Noble and Steve Richards were the pit reporters during the broadcast.

Standings after the race

Drivers' Championship standings

Manufacturers' Championship standings

Note: Only the first 16 positions are included for the driver standings.
. – Driver has clinched a position in the Monster Energy NASCAR Cup Series playoffs.

References

Coca-Cola 600
Coca-Cola 600
Coca-Cola 600
NASCAR races at Charlotte Motor Speedway